State Route 105 (SR 105) is an east–west state highway in the northwestern portion of the U.S. state of Ohio.  Its western terminus is at an interchange with Interstate 75 in Bowling Green that doubles as the southern terminus of State Route 64, and its eastern terminus is at State Route 19 in Oak Harbor.  For its final , the route overlaps State Route 163 which continues east.

History

Its western terminus was at then SR 34, later became U.S. Route 6 (US 6). The entire route was paved by 1934. Between 1967 and 1969, it was extended west to current western terminus, along the former US 6 alignment.

Major intersections

References

External links

105
Transportation in Wood County, Ohio
Transportation in Sandusky County, Ohio
Transportation in Ottawa County, Ohio